Tyra is a surname. Notable people with the surname include:

Charlie Tyra (1935—2006), American basketball player
Emily Tyra (born 1987), American actress, singer and dancer
Ralf Tyra (born 1958), German Lutheran theologian and pastor
Thomas Tyra (1933—1995), American composer and music educator
Vince Tyra (born 1965), American baseball player